Balzac's Coffee Roasters is a Canadian coffee company with sixteen retail locations in the GTA, Toronto Pearson International Airport, Niagara, Kitchener, Stratford, Guelph, St. Catharines, and Kingston.  The first Balzac’s café was opened in Stratford, Ontario, in 1996, by entrepreneur Diane Olson. The company's headquarters and roastery are now located in Ancaster, Ontario.  Named after the famous French novelist and famed coffee drinker Honoré de Balzac, the cafes serve traditional and fair trade blends, as well as espressos, hot chocolate and a variety of cold beverages.  Each of Balzac's Coffee Roasters locations has a café poster unique to its district.

Balzac's was featured in the sixth season of Dragon's Den; two of the venture capitalists on the show bought into the company. In 2016, the company started a new business, selling coffee beans in grocery stores across Canada, including Loblaws, Sobeys and Whole Foods.

References

External links

 

Coffeehouses and cafés in Canada
Companies based in Hamilton, Ontario